Broadcast since 1 May 1958 as China Central Television (CCTV), CMG has a total of 49 television channels as of February 2021, consisting of 26 free channels, 17 pay channels and 6 foreign channels, making CMG the world's largest number of TV channels operated by a single television network. All CMG channels are broadcasting around the world through satellite, cable and on Internet television. Those channels are listed below in sequence of launch day.

Television channels

Free public channels 
All channels below are using Mandarin Chinese, with some news-related programmes showing sign language on the bottom-left or bottom-right.

Foreign channels 

Except two English channels, HD format signals aren't available within China.

Pay channels 
All channels below are using Mandarin Chinese. The previous 13 channels are owned by Central Digital Television Media Co., Ltd., their HD signals were launched in 23 September 2019, and their SD signals were shutted down in 2020. The last 3 channels are owned by CND Films.

Overseas channels 
None of channels below are available for subscribers within Mainland China.

Former channels 

 China 3D TV Test Channel - a television channel broadcasting various digital 3D television content.

CCTV High Definition Test - The first HDTV channel in the Great China area, as well as the world's first Chinese-speaking HDTV channel, launched in 1 October 1999, closed date 2013
CCTV Security information - pay channel
Universe Satellite Network
GalaxySatellite (TM)
plus an additional 10+ advanced integration satellite providers if possible

International broadcasts 
It is possible to receive channels CCTV-4 (Mandarin channel targeted at an overseas Chinese audience), CGTN (targeting an English-speaking audience), CGTN Spanish (in Spanish) and CGTN French (in French) outside China by using a Digital Video Broadcast signal (plus additional broadcast support together with Dolby Stereo, Dolby Surround, Dolby SR, Dolby Digital Advanced Sound Quality Definition and Improvement System Support, technologized and developed by Dolby Laboratories, Datasat, and the SDDS for digital audio system supportments). CCTV has just recently switched from analog to DVB primarily due to better signal quality and the ability to charge for reception (about US$10 per year subscription). The overseas channels are widely available across many cable and satellite providers.

See also
 China Global Television Network
 China Network Television

References

External links
 

Channels

 
Cable television in Hong Kong
Multilingual news services